Massey Hamilton Shepherd Jr. (1913–1990) was an American priest and scholar of the Episcopal Church. A prominent liturgist, he was one of the few American members of other Christian churches honored with an invitation to observe the Second Vatican Council of the Roman Catholic Church in the 1960s. He served on the Episcopal Church's Standing Liturgical Commission from 1947 to 1976 and was a leading figure in developing the 1979 revision of the Book of Common Prayer used by the Episcopal Church.

Early life
Shepherd was born on March 14, 1913, in Wilmington, North Carolina, the second child and only son of Alice Louise Gladstone Melville and Massey Hamilton Shepherd Sr. His older sister Eloise Shepherd McEachern, b. January 13, 1909, as an adult, after marriage, remained in Wilmington until close to her death at 75, on October 8, 1984, Charleston, SC.  He spent many of his younger years in Columbia, South Carolina. He was confirmed in what is now Trinity Episcopal Cathedral, across from the State House in South Carolina's capital city.

Shepherd was married to Gabriella Taylor Connor, an artist and watercolorist. They had one daughter, Nancy Lloyd, who is married and has two children.

Academic career
In 1928, he finished at the top of his class at Columbia High School at fifteen in Columbia, South Carolina.  Less than four years later, he received both an undergraduate and a graduate degree simultaneously from the University of South Carolina in classical studies. Shepherd was one of the youngest students in the history of the university to achieve two degrees by age 19. In 1937, he received his Doctor of Philosophy degree from the University of Chicago and, in 1941, his Bachelor of Divinity degree from Berkeley Divinity School in New Haven, Connecticut, where he worked closely with its Dean, liturgical reformer William Palmer Ladd, whose work he was to continue.

Early in his teaching career he held a faculty position at the Episcopal Theological School in Cambridge, Massachusetts. For many years, he was a faculty member at the Church Divinity School of the Pacific in Berkeley, California, and also in the Graduate Theological Union.

He was instrumental in the success of the Sewanee Church Music Conference which began in July 1951 at the University of the South at Sewanee, Tennessee. Richard White (who served as registrar for 13 years) related: "He was probably the finest liturgist in the country. He could talk for fifty minutes (the length of the classes) on the Prayer Book, the psalms, the structure of the service, etc. with no notes and never searched for a word."

Shepherd also served as the head of the Church Historical Society for many years.

He was the author of over eighty publications, including The Living Liturgy (Oxford University Press, 1946), 
The Oxford American Prayer Book Commentary (Oxford University Press, 1950), and 
The Worship of the Church, Seabury Press, 1952).

He contributed commentaries on the Gospel According to John and the three Epistles of John to The Interpreter's One-Volume Commentary on the Bible (Abingdon Press, 1971).

In The Paschal Liturgy and the Apocalypse he refers to the Revelation to St. John the Divine in parallel to the Last Supper.

Shepherd died on February 19, 1990, in Sacramento, California. His ashes are interred on Signal Mountain, Tennessee, next to his wife, Gaby.

See also
 Marion J. Hatchett

References

Footnotes

Bibliography

Further reading

External links
Bibliographic directory from Project Canterbury

1913 births
1990 deaths
20th-century American Episcopalians
20th-century American historians
American male non-fiction writers
20th-century American theologians
20th-century American Episcopal priests
20th-century Anglican theologians
Academics from California
Academics from North Carolina
American Episcopal theologians
Anglican liturgists
Christians from California
Episcopal Divinity School faculty
Episcopalians from North Carolina
Historians from California
Presidents of the American Society of Church History
Religious leaders from California
Religious leaders from North Carolina
University of Chicago alumni
University of South Carolina alumni
Writers from Wilmington, North Carolina
20th-century American male writers